This article contains information about the literary events and publications of 1900.

Events
March 5 – New York performances of the play Sapho curbed for immorality. 
March 15 – Sarah Bernhardt stars in premiere of Edmond Rostand's l'Aiglon.
May
Rainer Maria Rilke makes his second visit to Russia with Lou Andreas-Salomé and her husband.
The first film to feature the detective character Sherlock Holmes, Sherlock Holmes Baffled, is released by the American Mutoscope and Biograph Company.
May 17 – L. Frank Baum's The Wonderful Wizard of Oz is published in Chicago, the first of Baum's books chronicling the fictional Land of Oz for children.
June 24 – The Hanlin Academy in Peking, housing "the oldest and richest library in the world", catches fire and is destroyed during the Boxer Rebellion.
June 25 – The Taoist monk Wang Yuanlu discovers the Dunhuang manuscripts in the Library Cave or Cave for Preserving Scriptures, No. 17 of the Mogao Caves in north-west China, where they have been sealed since the early 11th century.
July 1 – The Net Book Agreement comes into force in the U.K: publishers will supply booksellers only on condition that they do not retail the supplied books at a discounted rate.
October 15 – Mark Twain ends an absence from the United States of some nine years when he returns to New York aboard the Atlantic Transport Line steamship Minnehaha. 
November 1 – Ermete Novelli opens the "Casa di Goldoni", a new theatre in imitation of the Comédie Française, at Rome.
November 19 – August Strindberg's To Damascus (Till Damaskus, first two parts) receives its première at the Royal Dramatic Theatre in Stockholm with August Palme and Harriet Bosse, Strindberg's future wife, in the leading rôles.
unknown dates
In Austrian-Hungarian Bosnia, Osman Nuri Hadžić issues Behar, the first Bosnian Muslim literary journal, promoting liberal Islam within the Islamic revival movement.
The first film of Hamlet is an adaptation of the duel scene, with the French actress Sarah Bernhardt playing the title rôle.

New books
[[File:The Wonderful Wizard of Oz, 006.png|150px|thumb|right|The first edition title page of one of the most prominent literary works of the year 1900, L. Frank Baum's The Wonderful Wizard of Oz.]]

Fiction
Pío Baroja – The House of Aizgorri (La casa de Aizgorri, first in trilogy The Basque Country (La Tierra Vasca)
Mary Elizabeth Braddon – The InfidelErnest Bramah – The Wallet of Kai LungGelett Burgess – Goops, and How to Be Them (1st in the Goops series)
Colette – Claudine at School (Claudine à l'école)Joseph Conrad – Lord JimMarie Corelli – The Master ChristianLouis CouperusLangs lijnen van geleidelijkheidDe stille kracht (The Hidden Force)Stephen Crane – Whilomville StoriesGabriele D'Annunzio – The Flame of Life (Il Fuoco)Theodore Dreiser – Sister CarrieMary E. Wilkins Freeman – The Heart's HighwayRobert Grant – Unleavened BreadThomas Anstey Guthrie – The Brass BottleMaurice Hewlett – The Life and Death of Richard Yea-and-NayJerome K. Jerome – Three Men on the BummelDmitry Merezhkovsky – The Romance of Leonardo da Vinci (Russian: Воскресшие боги. Леонардо да Винчи, literally Resurrected Gods: Leonardo da Vinci)
Octave Mirbeau – The Diary of a Chambermaid (Le Journal d'une femme de chambre)F. D. J. Pangemanann – Tjerita Si TjonatBradford C. Peck – The World a Department StoreI. L. Peretz – "Oyb Nisht Nokh Hekher" (If Not Higher; short story)
Henryk Sienkiewicz – The Teutonic Knights (Krzyżacy)Flora Annie SteelThe Hosts of the LordVoices in the NightBooth Tarkington – Monsieur BeaucaireFrederik van Eeden – Van de koele meren des doods (From the Cool Lakes of Death)
Jules VerneThe Will of an EccentricThe Castaways of the FlagMary Augusta Ward – EleanorH. G. Wells – Love and Mr LewishamChildren and young people
L. Frank BaumA New WonderlandThe Wonderful Wizard of OzHarriet Theresa Comstock – Molly, the Drummer BoyAndrew Lang – The Grey Fairy BookEmilio Salgari – The Tigers of Mompracem (Le Tigri di Mompracem)Drama
David Belasco – Madame Butterfly
José Echegaray – El loco Dios (The Madman Divine)
Clyde Fitch – Captain Jinks of the Horse Marines
Herman Heijermans – Op Hoop van Zegen
James Herne – Sag Harbor
Haralamb Lecca – Quarta. Jucătoriĭ de cărțĭ
George Moore – The Bending of the Bough: a comedy in five acts
George Bernard Shaw – Captain Brassbound's Conversion
Arthur Schnitzler – La Ronde (German: Reigen; privately printed)
August Strindberg
The Dance of Death (Dödsdansen)
Easter (Påsk)
To Damascus (Till Damaskus) opens in Sweden
Hermann Sudermann – Fires of St. John

Musicals

 Owen Hall, Leslie Stuart - FlorodoraPoetryOxford Book of English Verse 1250–1900 (edited by Arthur Quiller-Couch)
G. K. Chesterton – The Wild Knight and Other PoemsSir Walter Scott, Bart. (posthumously edited by Andrew Lang) – The Poems and BalladsIsmail Hossain Shiraji – Anal PrabahaNon-fiction
William "Cocktail" Boothby – The World's Drinks And How To Mix ThemWinston ChurchillIan Hamilton's MarchLondon to Ladysmith via PretoriaArthur Conan Doyle – The Great Boer WarNicolae IorgaOpinions sincères (Sincere Opinions)Opinions pérnicieuses d'un mauvais patriote (Pernicious Opinions of a Poor Patriot)
Gertrude Jekyll – Home and GardenAndrew LangA History of Scotland, vol. 1Prince Charles EdwardGuide Michelin (1st issue)
Joaquim Nabuco – My Formation (Minha formação)The Nuttall Encyclopaedia (editor James Wood)
José Enrique Rodó - ArielSamuel Marinus Zwemer – Arabia: The Cradle of IslamBirths
January – Elisabeth Inglis-Jones, Welsh novelist and biographer (died 1994)
January 9 – Emmanuel D'Astier, French journalist (died 1969)
January 11 – Borden Chase, American writer (died 1971)
January 15 – William Heinesen, Faroese writer (died 1991)
January 31 – Clare Hoskyns-Abrahall, English biographer and children's writer (died 1990)
February 4 – Jacques Prévert, French poet (died 1977)
February 19 – Giorgos Seferis, Greek poet (died 1971)
February 22 – Seán Ó Faoláin, Irish short story writer (died 1991)
March 7 – Benn Levy, English playwright and politician (died 1973)
March 15 – Gilberto Freyre, Brazilian author (died 1987)
April 19 – Richard Hughes, English novelist (died 1976)
April 20 – Constantin S. Nicolăescu-Plopșor, Romanian anthropologist, ethnographer and children's writer (died 1968)
April 22 – Vyvyan Adams (Watchman), English writer and politician (died 1951)
April 24 – Elizabeth Goudge, English novelist and children's author (died 1984)
April 26 – Roberto Arlt, Argentine novelist, playwright and journalist (died 1942)
April 28 – Antonieta Rivas Mercado, Mexican feminist writer and patron of the arts (died 1931)
May 1 – Ignazio Silone, Italian author and politician (died 1978)
May 6 – Garrett Mattingly, American historian (died 1962)
May 24 – Eduardo De Filippo, Italian author (died 1984)
May 28 – Nan Chauncy, English-born Australian children's writer (died 1970)
June 7 – Jan Engelman, Dutch writer (died 1972)
June 11 – Leopoldo Marechal, Argentine writer (died 1970)
June 19 – Ștefan Voitec, Romanian politician and journalist (died 1984)
June 25 – Gerald Drayson Adams, English screenwriter (died 1988)
June 29 – Antoine de Saint-Exupéry, French novelist (died 1944)
July 2 – Tyrone Guthrie, English theatrical director (died 1971)
July 18 – Nathalie Sarraute, Russian-born Francophone lawyer and writer (died 1999)
July 24 – Zelda Fitzgerald, American author (died 1948)
August 10 – Charles Shaw, Australian writer (died 1955)
September 7 – Taylor Caldwell, Anglo-American novelist (died 1985)
September 9 – James Hilton, English novelist (died 1954)
October 3 – Thomas Wolfe, American novelist (died 1938)
October 16 – Edward Ardizzone, English children's writer and illustrator (died 1979)
October 30 – Xia Yan (夏衍), Chinese playwright and screenwriter (died 1995)
November 8 – Margaret Mitchell, American novelist (died 1949)
November 19 – Anna Seghers, German writer (died 1983)
December 8 – Ants Oras, Estonian writer (died 1982)
December 16 – V. S. Pritchett, English short story writer (died 1997)unknown date – Saira Elizabeth Luiza Shah, Scottish writer (d. 1960)

Deaths
January 4 – Stanisław Mieroszewski, Polish-born politician, historian and writer (born 1827)
January 11 – James Martineau, English religious philosopher (born 1805) 
January 19 – William Larminie, Irish poet and folklorist (born 1849)
January 20
 R. D. Blackmore, English novelist (born 1825)
 John Ruskin, English art critic, social thinker, artist and poet (born 1819)
January 25 – Frederick H. Chapin, American author and explorer (born 1852)
February 6 – Elijah Benamozegh, Italian spiritual writer and rabbi (born 1822)
February 14 – Giovanni Canestrini, Italian scientist, essayist and translator (born 1835)
February 18 – Eugenio Beltrami, Italian mathematician and theorist (born 1835)
February 23 – Ernest Dowson, English poet and novelist (born 1867)
March 11 – Joseph Louis François Bertrand, French mathematics writer (born 1822)
March 30 – David Léon Cahun, French Orientalist and writer (born 1841)
April 5 – Maria Louise Eve, American author (born 1842)
April 12 – James Richard Cocke, American author and hypnotherapist (born 1863)
April 21 – Charles Beecher, American composer, minister and writer (born 1815)
April 23 – Charles Isaac Elton, English historian, politician and writer (born 1839)
April 27 – Francišak Bahuševič, Belarusian poet, writer and lawyer (born 1840)
April 30 – George Campbell, 8th Duke of Argyll, Scottish politician and writer (born 1823)
May 4 – Hugo Badalić, Croatian writer and scholar (born 1851)
May 20 – André Léo, French novelist and journalist (born 1824)
May 28 – Sir George Grove, English writer and lexicographer on music (born 1820)
June 2 – Clarence Cook, American author and art critic (born 1828)
June 3 – Mary Kingsley, English travel writer and explorer (born 1862)
June 4 – Edwards Amasa Park, American theologian, pastor and writer (born 1808)
June 5 – Stephen Crane, American writer, journalist and poet (born 1871)
June 12 – Lucretia Peabody Hale, American journalist and author (born 1820)
June 19 – Salvador Camacho, Colombian economist, politician and writer (born 1827)
July 3 – Fernand Brouez, Belgian editor and founder of La Société Nouvelle (born 1861)
July 6 – Gustav Jacob Born, German medical author and histologist (born 1851)
July 22 – Lucius E. Chittenden, American writer and politician (born 1824)
July 29 – Henry Spencer Ashbee, English writer and bibliographer (born 1834)
August 2 – Sydney Robert Bellingham, Irish-Canadian journalist and politician (born 1808)
August 16 – José Maria de Eça de Queiroz, Portuguese novelist (born 1845)
August 25 – Friedrich Nietzsche, German philosopher and philologist (born 1844)
August 28 – Henry Sidgwick, English philosopher (born 1838)
September 18 – Anne Beale, Welsh novelist and poet (born 1816)
September 29 – Samuel Fenton Cary, American author and prohibitionist (born 1814)
October 13 – Louis Adolphe Cochery, French journalist and politician (born 1819)
October 20 
 Naim Frashëri, Albanian poet (born 1846)
 Charles Dudley Warner, American writer (born 1829)
October 27 – James Henry Bowker, South African naturalist (born 1822)
November 12 – F. Burge Griswold, American poet and short story writer (born 1826)
November 12 – Thomas Arnold the Younger, English literary scholar (born 1823)
November 16 – Isidore Barthe, French-Canadian journalist and translator (born 1834)
November 27 – David Carnegie, Australian travel writer (born 1871)
November 30 – Oscar Wilde, Irish poet, dramatist and short story writer (born 1854)
December 15 – Charles Cotesworth Beaman, American lawyer and author (born 1840)
December 30 – Henry Ames Blood, American poet, dramatist and historian (born 1836)
December 31 – Oscar Alin, Swedish historian, politician and author (born 1846)unknown date'' – Berdakh, Uzbek poet (born 1827)

See also
1900 in poetry
List of years in literature

References

 
Years of the 19th century in literature